Aretusa was the name of at least three ships of the Italian Navy and may refer to:

 , a  launched in 1891 and discarded in 1912.
 , a  launched in 1938 and stricken in 1958.
 , an  launched in 2000.

Italian Navy ship names